The 2010 South Carolina State Bulldogs football team represented South Carolina State University in the 2010 NCAA Division I FCS football season. The team was led by Oliver Pough in his ninth year as head coach and played its home games at Oliver C. Dawson Stadium. It finished the regular season with a 9–2 record overall and a 7–1 record in the Mid-Eastern Athletic Conference, making them conference co-champions alongside Bethune–Cookman. The team qualified for the playoffs, in which it was eliminated in the first round by Georgia Southern.

Schedule

References

South Carolina State
South Carolina State Bulldogs football seasons
Mid-Eastern Athletic Conference football champion seasons
South Carolina State
South Carolina State Bulldogs football